The North-Western Shipping Company is a Russian ship-owning company within UCL Holding and is ultimately controlled by Vladimir Lisin's Fletcher Group Holdings Ltd. Founded in 1923 as the North-Western River Shipping Company, the company now owns a fleet of 107 vessels, totaling 400,000 DWT (Dead Weight Tons).

Business Description 
The North-Western Shipping Company serves an important role of delivering dry, general, and oversize cargoes from Europe and elsewhere to the Russian hinterland cost-effectively.

The North-Western Shipping Company's fleet of vessels includes dry cargo ships, bulk carriers between 1,500 and 7,000 DWT capable of  navigating both rivers and seas.

References 

Transport companies of Russia
Transport companies established in 1923
1923 establishments in the Soviet Union
Companies based in Saint Petersburg